The Italian Catholic diocese of Iglesias is in Sardinia. It is a suffragan of the archdiocese of Cagliari.

History

The Diocese of Sulci was an episcopal seat as early as the seventh century. After its decline the bishop of Sulci took up his residence at the village of Tratalias; in 1503 the seat was officially moved to Iglesias but in 1514 the Diocese was reunited with the Archdiocese of Cagliari

In 1763 the see was re-established, and Luigi Satta appointed bishop. 

The cathedral of Iglesias (then Villa di Chiesa) was erected by the Pisans in 1285, but has been restored in later times. The previous cathedral located in Tratalias was built in a Pisan-Romanesque style between 1213 and 1282.

Bishops
Luigi Satta (1763–1772 Died)
Giovanni Ignazio Gautier (1772–1773 Died)
Francesco Antonio Deplano (1775–1781 Died)
Giacinto Francesco Rolfi, O.E.S.A. (1783–1789 Died)
Giuseppe Domenico Porqueddu (1792–1799 Died)
Nicolo Navoni (1800–1819 Confirmed, Archbishop of Cagliari)
Giovanni Nepomuceno Ferdiani (1819–1841 Died)
Raimondo Orrù (1842–Did Not Take Effect)
Giovanni Stephano Masala (1842–Did Not Take Effect)
Giovanni Battista Montixi (1844–1884 Died)
Raimondo Ingheo-Ledda (1884–1907 Resigned)
Giuseppe Dallepiane (1911–1920 Died)
Saturnino Peri (1920–1929 Resigned)
Giovanni Pirastru (1930–1970 Retired)
Giovanni Cogoni (1970–1992 Retired)
Arrigo Miglio (1992–1999 Appointed, Bishop of Ivrea)
Tarcisio Pillolla (1999–2007 Retired)
Giovanni Paolo Zedda (8 March 2007 – 6 October 2022)

References
 

Iglesias
Religious organizations established in 1763
Davenport